Ioannis Vasilεiadis (1924 – 30 March  2012) was a Greek politician and former admiral who served as a Member of Parliament from 1985 to 1993. During this time he was deputy National Defense Minister with the government of July 1989, and  Minister of Public Order from 1990 to 1991.

References

|-

1924 births
2012 deaths
New Democracy (Greece) politicians
Government ministers of Greece
Hellenic Navy admirals
Greek MPs 1985–1989
Greek MPs 1989 (June–November)
Greek MPs 1989–1990
Greek MPs 1990–1993
Ministers of Public Order of Greece
People from Aigio